Samoa was represented at the 2006 Commonwealth Games in Melbourne.

Medals

Medalists

Gold

Silver

Bronze
 Warren Fuavailili, Boxing, Middleweight 75 kg

2006
Nations at the 2006 Commonwealth Games
Commonwealth Games